Charles Snyder may refer to:

 C. B. J. Snyder (Charles B. J. Snyder, 1860–1945), American architect
 Charles Snyder (baseball) (1873–1901), American catcher and right fielder in Major League Baseball
 Charles P. Snyder (politician) (Charles Philip Snyder, 1847–1915), West Virginia lawyer, politician
 Charles P. Snyder (admiral) (Charles Philip Snyder, 1879–1964), first Inspector General of the United States Navy during World War II
 Charles R. Snyder (1944–2006), University of Kansas professor
 Charles A. Snyder, Pennsylvania politician
 Charlie Snyder (American football) (c. 1922 – 2007), head football coach at Marshall University, 1959–1967
 Pop Snyder (Charles N. Snyder, 1854–1924), American catcher and manager in Major League Baseball